Sierraperla is a genus of roach-like stoneflies in the family Peltoperlidae. There are at least two described species in Sierraperla.

Species
These two species belong to the genus Sierraperla:
 Sierraperla cora (Needham & Smith, 1916) (giant roachfly)
 Sierraperla tolowa Stark & Kondratieff, 2015

References

Further reading

 
 

Plecoptera
Articles created by Qbugbot